Samir Soni  is an Indian film and television actor, director and former fashion model.

Career
Soni made his debut in the Hindi serial Samandar. In 1996, he appeared as Ashok Mathur in Doordarshan's A Mouthful Of Sky. He made his film debut in China Gate (1998), which was followed by cameo appearances. In 2003, Soni appeared in the film Baghban and played lead roles in Basti and Kahan Ho Tum. Also that year, Soni also worked in the television series Jassi Jaissi Koi Nahin. In 2004, he worked in Saaksshi. Soni featured as a contestant in the reality television show Bigg Boss 4 in 2010.

Soni played the lead role in Ekta Kapoor's Indian soap opera Parichay - Nayee Zindagi Kay Sapno Ka (2013), which earned him the Indian Telly Award for Best Actor, and ITA Award for Best Actor - Drama (Popular) in 2012.

In 2018, he debuted as a film director with My Birthday Song, starring Sanjay Suri.

Personal life

Through modeling, he met Rajlakshmi Khanvilkar. The two were married for six months before they divorced. He was in a relationship with Nafisa Joseph and got engaged to her. The engagement lasted two years before they broke up. On 24 January 2011, he married former actress Neelam Kothari. Together they have a daughter.

Filmography

Films

Direction

Television

Web series

Accolades

References

External links

 
 
 

1968 births
English male models
English male film actors
Male actors in Hindi cinema
British male television actors
British expatriates in India
British Hindus
Living people
University of California, Los Angeles alumni
Bigg Boss (Hindi TV series) contestants
Punjabi people